White River is an unincorporated community in Gibson County, Indiana, in the United States.

It took its name from the White River (Indiana).

References

Unincorporated communities in Gibson County, Indiana
Unincorporated communities in Indiana